Peter Robertson (February 1908 – 1964) was a Scottish footballer who played in the Football League for Charlton Athletic, Crystal Palace and Rochdale.

References

1895 births
1979 deaths
Scottish footballers
Association football goalkeepers
English Football League players
Lochee United F.C. players
Dundee F.C. players
Charlton Athletic F.C. players
Crystal Palace F.C. players
Dundee United F.C. players
Brechin City F.C. players
Arbroath F.C. players
Rochdale A.F.C. players